This is a list of notable Arabs.

Public figures

Politicians

Presidents
Adib Shishakli (born 1909), President of Syria 

 Houari Boumédiène (1932–1978), second president of Algeria. 
 Anwar Sadat (1918–1981), third president of Egypt. 
 Gamal Abdel Nasser (1918–1970), second president of Egypt
 Hosni Mubarak, former President of Egypt
 Mohamed Naguib, first President of Egypt
 Khalifa bin Zayed Al Nahyan, son of Zayed bin Sultan Al Nahyan and second president of the United Arab Emirates
 Hafez al-Assad, president of Syria from 1971 to 2000
 Saddam Hussein, former President of Iraq
 Zayed bin Sultan Al Nahyan (1918–2004), president of UAE from 1971 to 2004
 Omar al-Bashir (born 1944), former President of Sudan
 Mahmoud Abbas, President of the State of Palestine
 Bashar al-Assad, current president of Syria and son of Hafez

Monarchs
 Herod the Great (72–4 BCE), King of Judea from 37 to 4 BCE
 Hussein bin Talal (1935–1999), King of Jordan from 1952 to 1999
 Abdullah II Al-Hussein, King of Jordan since 1999
 Faisal of Saudi Arabia (1904–1975), King of Saudi Arabia from 1964 to 1975
 Ibn Saud (1876–1953), first king of Saudi Arabia
 Saud ibn Abd al-Aziz ibn Abd al-Rahman Al Saud (1902–1969), second king of Saudi Arabia
 Mohammed VI of Morocco (born 1963), king of Morocco 1999 to present

Others
 Abdelkhader Houamel, (Algerian) painter, he received the Gold medal for Arabian arts. 
 Ahmed Lutfi el-Sayed
Fendi Al-Fayez 19th century tribal leader.
 Boutros Boutros-Ghali, former Secretary-General of the United Nations
 Dodi Fayed, businessman and Princess Diana's partner
Faris Al-Rawi (Iraqi father), Attorney General of Trinidad and Tobago
 George J. Mitchell, (Lebanese) United States of America special envoy to the Middle East under the Obama administration, U.S. senator from Maine, Senate Majority Leader.
 Hanan Ashrawi (born 1946), Palestinian legislator
 Harun al-Rashid (763–809), fifth Abbasid caliph
 John E. Sununu (Palestinian), Senator from New Hampshire
 John H. Sununu (Palestinian), Governor of New Hampshire and White House Chief of Staff under George H. W. Bush.
 Mohamed ElBaradei (born 1942), Egyptian, Director General of the International Atomic Energy Agency from 1997 to 2009
 Mohammed bin Zayed Al Nahyan, Crown Prince of Abu Dhabi and brother of Khalifa bin Zayed Al Nahyan  
 Muhammad Abduh
 Muhammad Husayn Haykal
 Mustafa Kamil Pasha
 Mustafa Wahbi (1919–1971) Jordanian poet, lawyer, teacher, judge, political agitator and philosopher
 Nadya Suleman (Iraqi father), "Octomom"
 Nick Rahall (Lebanese), Congressman from West Virginia.
 Osama bin Laden (1957–2011), founder of al-Qaeda
 Qasim Amin
 Rifa'a el-Tahtawi
 Rosemary Barkett (Syrian), first woman Supreme Court Justice and Chief Justice for the state of Florida.
Mithqal Al-Fayez Jordanian Political Leader
 Saad Zaghlul
 Spencer Abraham (Lebanese), Senator from Michigan and Secretary of Energy under Bush.
 Steve Bracks (born 1954), Lebanese Australian politician
 Talaat Pasha Harb
 Umar ibn Abd al-Aziz (682–720), notable Umayyad Caliph
 Yasser Arafat, (1929–2004), Palestinian leader and a Laureate of the Nobel Prize.
 Muammar Gaddafi (1942–2011), former Libyan leader
 Mohammed bin Rashid Al Maktoum (born 1949), prime minister of UAE and ruler of Dubai
 Jamal Khashoggi, former Saudi man murdered for his political views

Military
 Abdel Ghani el-Gamasy
 Abdullah ibn Aamir (622–678), Rashidun Arab general
 'Abd Allah ibn Rawahah (?–629), Arab general
 Abu Ubaydah ibn al-Jarrah (583–638), Rashidun Arab military commander
 Ahnaf ibn Qais (?–660), Rashidun Arab military commander
 Al-Muthanna ibn Haritha, Rashidun Arab general
 Al-Qa'qa'a ibn Amr at-Tamimi, Rashidun Arab general
 Amr bin Al'aas (592–664), Rashidun Arab Armilitary commander
 Ikrimah ibn Abu Jahl (?–636), Rashidun Arab general
 Hamza ibn Abd al-Muttalib (567–625), Muslim general, also known as "Lion of God"
 Hashim ibn Utbah, Rashidun Arab general
 Hudhayfah ibn al-Yaman (?–656), Rashidun Arab general
 Khalid ibn al-Walid (592–642), Rashidun Arab military commander, also known as "sayf al-Allah" (Swords from the swords of God)
 George Joulwan (Lebanese), retired general, former NATO commander-in-chief
 John Abizaid (Lebanese), retired general
 Mavia, warrior queen
 An-Numan ibn Muqarrin (?–641), Rashidun Arab general
 Saad el-Shazly (1922–2011), Egypt's chief of staff during the October War
 Sa'd ibn Abi Waqqas (595–674), Rashidun Arab military commander
 Shurhabil ibn Hasana (583–639), Rashidun Arab general
 Ubayda ibn as-Samit, Rashidun Arab general
 Yazid ibn Abu Sufyan (?–640), Rashidun Arab general
 Zayd ibn Harithah, Arab general
 Zenobia, Arab general 
 Zubayr ibn al-Awwam (594–656), Rashidun Arab general

Activists
 Jamal al-Dhari
 Ralph Nader, (Lebanese) consumer advocate, politician, first Arab American to run for President of the United States.
 Salem Hanna Khamis
 Toujan al-Faisal
 Ibtihal Al-Khatib
 Islah Jad
 James Zogby, (Lebanese) founder and president of the Arab American Institute.
 Umar al-Tilmisani, third General Guide (Murshid al-'Am) of the Egyptian Muslim Brothers
 Zainab Salbi, (Iraqi), co-founder and president of Women for Women International.
 Rahaf Al Qunoon
 Loujain Al Hathloul
 Wajeha Al Huwaider
 Sarah Idan, Iraqi American activist and former Miss Iraq.

Religious figures
 Prophet Muhammad (570/571–632), Prophet anda Messenger
 Abu Bakr, companion of Muhammad and First Caliph
 Abu Ubaidah ibn al-Jarrah 
 Aisha (d. 678), the third wife of Muhammad, the daughter of the first caliph Abu Bakr, and narrator of many hadith
 Ali ibn Abi Talib (c. 599–661), cousin and son-in-law of Muhammad and Fourth Caliph, according to Shi'a Muslims, his successor
 Abdullah ibn Abbas, Early Islamic Scholar also Companion (Sahabi) and cousin of Muhammad.
 Hafsa bint Umar, wife of Muhammad and the daughter of the second caliph Umar Ibn al-Khattab
 Khadijah bint Khuwaylid (555–619), first wife of Muhammad
 Muadh ibn Jabal
 Mus'ab ibn Umair (594/598–625), the first ambassador of Islam
 Saeed ibn Zaid
 Omar, companion of Muhammad and Second Caliph
 Uthman, companion of Muhammad and Third Caliph
 Zayd ibn Thabit, personal scribe of Muhammad and was assigned the role of authenticating and collecting the oral Quranic traditions into a single bounded volume

Scientific and academic figures

Mathematics, physics and chemistry
 Ahmed ibn Yusuf (835–912), mathematician
 Ibn Tahir al-Baghdadi (980–1037), arithmetician
 Ibrahim ibn Sinan (908–946), mathematician and astronomer in Baghdad
 Al-Uqlidisi (920–980), author of two works on arithmetic. He may have anticipated the invention of decimals.
 Al-Umawi (1400–1489), mathematician who wrote works on mensuration and arithmetic.
 Al-Zarqali (1028–1087), influential early mathematician and astronomer
 Ahmed Zewail (born 1946), Egyptian-American scientist, winner of the 1999 Nobel Prize in Chemistry
 Farouk El-Baz (born 1938), Egyptian scientist
 Charles Elachi, Lebanese director of the Jet Propulsion Laboratory
 Fawwaz T. Ulaby, Syrian winner of the 2006 IEEE Edison Medal and former Vice President of Research for the University of Michigan.
 George A. Doumani, geologist whose explorations helped prove the theory of continental drift.
 Ali ibn Ridwan (c. 988–c. 1061), astronomer and geometer with Khalid Ben Abdulmelik.
 Muhammad al-Fazari, credited with building the first astrolabe in the Islamic world.

Biology and medicine
 Abd el-Latif el-Baghdadi (1162–1231), physician, historian and Egyptologist
 Al-Asma'i (739–831), pioneer of Zoology, Botany and Animal Husbandry
 Afif Abdul Wahab, doctor surgeon
 Daniel Amen, neuroscientist and author of Lebanese descent
 Ibn Zuhr (1091–1161), prominent physician and parasitologist
 Ibn Abi Usaibia (1203–1270, Damascus, Syria), Arab physician and historian; wrote Uyun al-Anba fi Tabaqat al-Atibba or Lives of the Physicians.
 Michael DeBakey, cardiac surgeon of Lebanese descent.
 Nayef Al-Rodhan, neuroscientist, philosopher and geostrategist
 Paul Nassif, Plastic surgeon of Lebanese descent, Doctor on the reality show Botched
 Sami Ibrahim Haddad, doctor, surgeon and writer
 Wafaa El-Sadr, director of the International Center for AIDS Care and Treatment Programs

Engineering
 Abdel-Wahed El-Wakil, architect
 Hassan Fathy (1900–1989), noted Egyptian architect
 Hassan Kamel Al-Sabbah (1895–1935), early electrical and electronics research engineer, mathematician and inventor.
 Rifat Chadirji, architect
 Suad Amiry, architect
 Zaha Hadid (1950–2016), Iraqi-British architect

Humanities and social sciences
 Edward Said (1935–2003), Palestinian-American literary theorist.
 Ella Shohat, Professor of Cultural Studies at New York University, author and lecturer.
 Ibn Wahshiyya (fl. 9th century/10th century), one of the first historians to partly decipher Egyptian hieroglyphs.
 Jack Shaheen, emeritus professor of mass communications at Southern Illinois University and author.
 Nada Shabout (born 1962), Iraqi American art historian, lecturer, author.
 Sasson Somekh (1933–2019), Professor Emeritus of Modern Arab Literature at Tel Aviv University.
 Usamah ibn Munqidh (1095–1188, Damascus, Syria), Arab historian, politician, and diplomat.

Philosophy
 Nassim Nicholas Taleb, philosopher, researcher, and veteran practitioner of financial mathematics
 Nayef Al-Rodhan, philosopher, neuroscientist and geostrategist

Traveling
 Ahmad ibn Fadlan, (10th century, Baghdad, Iraq) traveler; member of an embassy of the Caliph of Baghdad
 Ibn Majid (1421–c.1500), Arabian navigator

Writing
 Ahmad al-Qalqashandi (1355–1418), writer
Abbas Ibn al-Ahnaf (750–809), (عباس بن الأحنف)
Iliyya Abu Madi (d. 1957)
Layla al-Akhyaliyyah (d. 704)
Abu-l-'Atahiya (d. 828)
Muhyi al-din ibn al-'Arabi (d. 1240)
Abdullah ibn al-Mu'tazz (861–908)
Abd Al-Rahman Abnudi (born 1938)
 Abdel latif Moubarak (born 1964)
Abdul Rahman Yusuf (born 1970)
Abo Al Qassim Al Shabbi 
Abu-l-'Atahiya (748–828)
Al-Mutanabbi (915–965)
Abu 'Afak (7th Century)
Abu Tammam (c. 805–845)
Abbas Al Akkad (1889–1964)
Adunis (born 1928)
Ali Al Jallawi (born 1975)
al-Akhtal (c. 640–710)
Maymun Ibn Qays Al-a'sha (570–625)
Muhammed Almagut (1934–2006)
Al-Rabi ibn Abu al-Huqayq (7th Century)
'Alqama ibn 'Abada (6th century)
Ibn Ammar (c. 1031–1086) 
Amr ibn Kulthum (6th century)
'Antara Ibn Shaddad (d. c. 580)
Asma bint Marwan
 Abu Layla al-Muhalhel
 Antarah ibn Shaddad
 Ibn Hawqal (943–969, Iraq), writer
 Imru' al-Qais
 Al-Khansa
 Al-A'sha
 Zuhayr bin Abi Sulma 
 Amr ibn Kulthum 
 Harith ibn Hilliza Al-Yashkuri 
 Labīd 
 Tarafa 
 Al-Nabigha

Mathematics
 Ahmed ibn Yusuf (835, Baghdad–912, Egypt), mathematician
 Al-Battani (850, Harran, Turkey–929, Qasr al-Jiss, Iraq), mathematician
 Thabit ibn Qurra (826–902, Harran, Turkey), mathematician

Other
 Abu al-Qasim al-Zahrawi (936–1013), Andalusian scientist; also known as Abulcasis
 Alhazen (965–c.1039), scientist from Basra (modern Iraq)
 Al-Jazari (1136–1206) polymath from Al-Jazira (modern Iraq/Syria)
 Christa McAuliffe, Arab American; schoolteacher/astronaut who lost her life aboard the space shuttle Challenger
 Taqi al-Din Muhammad ibn Ma'ruf (1526–1585), polymath from Damascus
 Ibn al-Haytham (Alhacen) (965, Basra, Buyid Emirate–1040, Cairo, Egypt), polymath and philosopher
 Wasil ibn Ata (700–748), theologian and jurist
 Al-Kindi (801, Basra, Iraq–873, Baghdad, Iraq), philosopher, polymath, mathematician, physician and musician

Arts and entertainment

Directors
 Amr Salama (born 1981), Egyptian film director
 Sherif Arafa (born 1960), Egyptian director, writer and producer
 Mai Masri (born 1959), Palestinian filmmaker, director and producer
 Tom Shadyac (born 1958), American director, screenwriter and producer of Lebanese descent
 Nadine Labaki (born 1974), Lebanese actress, director and activist

Producers
Mario Kassar (born 1951), Lebanese film producer
Tony Thomas (born 1948), American producer of Lebanese descent

Actors
 Ahmed Ezz (born 1971), Egyptian actor
 Ahd Kamel (born 1980), Saudi Arabian actress
 Amr Waked (born 1973), Egyptian actor
 Amel Bouchoucha (born 1982), Algerian actress
 Adel Emam (born 1940), Egyptian actor
 Aïcha Ben Ahmed (born 1983), Tunisian actress
 Ali Suliman (born 1974), palestinian actor
 Alia Shawkat (born 1989), American actress of Iraqi descent
 Anissa Jones (1958–1976), American child actress of Lebanese descent
 Abbas al-Noury (born 1952), famous Syrian actor and director
 Dhafer L'Abidine (born 1972), Tunisian actor
 Danny Thomas (1912–1991), American actor of Lebanese descent
 Dorra Zarrouk (born 1980), Tunisian actress
 Dina Shihabi (born 1989), Saudi Arabian actress
 Haifa Wehbe (born 1972), Lebanese former beauty pageant contestant, singer and actress
 Hiam Abbass (born 1960), Arab-Israeli actress
 Hend Sabry (born 1979), Tunisian actress and lawyer
 Jamie Farr (born 1934), American actor of Lebanese descent
 Kathy Najimy (born 1957), American actress of Lebanese descent
 Keanu Reeves (born 1964), Canadian actor of Lebanese descent
 Kal Naga (born 1975), Egyptian actor
 Kinda Alloush (born 1982), Syrian actress
 Omar Sharif (1932–2015), Egyptian actor
 Shannon Elizabeth (born 1973), American actress of Syrian descent
 Salma Hayek (born 1966), Mexican-American actress and producer of Lebanese descent
 Samer al-Masry (born 1969), Syrian actor
 Saba Mubarak (born 1976), Jordanian actress and producer
 Tony Shalhoub (born 1953), American executive producer and actor of Monk of Lebanese descent
 Taim Hasan (born 1977), Syrian actor
 Vic Tayback (1930–1990), American actor of Syrian descent
 Vince Vaughn (born 1970), American actor of Lebanese descent
 Wendie Malick (born 1950), American actress and fashion model of Egyptian descent
 Wentworth Miller (born 1972), American actor of Syrian descent
 Yousef Abu-Taleb, American actor and film producer of Jordanian descent
 Yousra (born 1955), Egyptian actress
 Yasmine Al Massri (born 1978), Palestinian actress
 Rami Malek (born 1981), American actor of Egyptian descent
 Rachid El Ouali (born 1965), Moroccan actor
 Michael Ansara (1922–2013), American actor of Syrian descent
 Mais Hamdan (born 1982), Jordanian actress, comedian, singer and television presenter
 Makram Khoury (born 1945), Arab-Israeli actor
 Monther Rayahneh (born 1979), Jordanian actor
 Mena Massoud (born 1991), Canadian actor of Egyptian descent
 Najwa Nimri (born 1972), Spanish actress of Jordanian descent
 Nadine Nassib Njeim (born 1984), Lebanese actress and former Miss Lebanon 2004
 Nelly Karim (born 1974), Egyptian actress
 Casey Kasem (1932–2014), American radio personality and voice actor of Lebanese descent
 Cyrine Abdelnour (born 1974), Lebanese singer, actress and model
 Claudia Cardinale (born 1938), Italian actress of Tunisian descent
 Lotfi Abdelli (born 1970), Tunisian actor

Comedians
 Ahmed Helmy (born 1969), Egyptian comedian, actor, film producer, television presenter and a renowned television personality
 Duraid Lahham (born 1934), Syrian comedian and director
 Ronnie Khalil (born 1977), American stand-up comedian of Egyptian descent
 Ramy Youssef (born 1991), American stand-up comedian and writer of Egyptian descent
 Remy Munasifi (born 1980) American comedian of Iraqi-Lebanese descent
 Tima Shomali (born 1985), Jordanian producer, director, writer, and comedian

Musicians
 Amr Diab (born 1961), Egyptian singer and composer of geel music
 Amal Murkus (born 1968), Arab-Palestinian singer
 Ahmed Mekky (born 1980), Egyptian actor, writer, director, rapper and singer
 Ahlam (born 1968), Emirati singer
 Asmahan (born 1912), Syrian singer and actress
 Assala Nasri (born 1969), Syrian singer
 Farid al-Atrash (born 1910), Syrian singer 
 Fairuz (born 1935), Lebanese singer
 Frank Zappa, (half Arab father) musician
 Fredwreck, Palestinian hip-hop producer
 Haifa Wehbe, Lebanese former beauty pageant contestant, singer and actress
 Hussain Al Jassmi, Emirati singer
 Kadim Al Sahir, Iraqi singer, composer, and songwriter
 Klay BBJ (born 1989), Tunisian rapper
 Karl Wolf, Lebanese singer
 Khaled, Algerian singer
 DJ Khaled, Palestinian rapper, music producer
 Lydia Canaan, Lebanese, singer-songwriter, recording artist
 Latifa (born 1968), Tunisian singer
 Mohammed Assaf (born 1989), Palestinian singer
 Mai Selim, Jordanian singer and actress
 Maryem Tollar, Egyptian singer who primarily sings Arabic songs
 Massari, Lebanese singer
 Myriam Fares, Lebanese singer, dancer, actress and entertainer
 Naser Mestarihi, (Jordanian father) Hard rock musician
 Nancy Ajram, Lebanese singer
 Omar Khorshid, Egyptian instrumental guitarist
 Paul Anka, Lebanese singer-songwriter
 Sammy Hagar, (partially Lebanese) rock musician and former lead singer of Van Halen
 Saad Lamjarred (born 1985), Moroccan singer
 Shadia Mansour, Palestinian singer and rapper
 Shatha Hassoun (born 1981), Iraqi-Moroccan singer
 Shakira, Colombian singer of Lebanese descent
 Tiffany Darwish aka Tiffany, American pop singer of Lebanese descent
 Umm Kulthum (c.1900–1975), Egyptian singer
 Wafah Dufour, (Saudi Arabian father), supermodel and singer
 Elissa, Lebanese singer
 Tamer Hosny, Egyptian singer, actor, composer, director and songwriter
 Tamer Nafar (born 1979), Palestinian rapper, actor, screenwriter and social activist
 Yasmine Hamdan (born 1976), Lebanese singer
Majida El Roumi, Lebanese singer

Fashion designers
 Elie Saab (born 1964), Lebanese fashion designer
 Zuhair Murad, fashion designer
 Reem Acra, Lebanese fashion designer
 Georges Chakra, Lebanese fashion designer

Cultural figures

Writers
 Abbas Mahmud al-Aqqad (1889–1964), Egyptian thinker and writer
 Charles Corm (Lebanese) (1894–1963), writer, businessman and philanthropist
 Abdel Rahman Shokry (born 1886), Egyptian poet
 Al-Khansa (7th century), Arabian poet
 Al-Mutanabbi (915–965), poet from Samawah (modern Iraq)
 Amin Maalouf (born 1949), Lebanese author
 Antarah ibn Shaddad (fl.580), Pre-Islamic Arabian hero and poet
 Fadwa Touqan (1917–2003), Palestinian Poet, known for  her representations of resistance to Israeli occupation in contemporary Arab poetry
 Mahmoud Darwish (1941–2008), Palestinian poet and author
 Ibrahim Touqan (1905–1941), Palestinian poet and college professor
 Imru' al-Qais (c.501–c.544), Arabian poet
 Khalil Gibran or Gibran Khalil Gibran (1883–1931), Lebanese-American writer, philosopher, and painter
 Naguib Mahfouz (1911–2006), Egyptian novelist
 Naomi Shihab Nye (born 1952), Palestinian-American writer
 Sinan Antoon (born 1967), Iraqi poet and novelist
 Taha Hussein (1889–1973), Egyptian writer
 Edward Said, Palestinian literary theorist and outspoken Palestinian activist
 Helen Thomas, Lebanese reporter, columnist and White House correspondent
 Nader El-Bizri, Lebanese philosopher, historian of science, and architect
 Ismail al-Faruqi, Palestinian philosopher and authority on Islam and comparative religion
 Mona Simpson, (Syrian father Abdulfattah Jandali) novelist
 Lorraine Ali, Iraqi reporter, editor, culture writer, and music critic for Newsweek
 Mohamed Ali al-Nasiri, Iraqi journalist
 Wafaa Abed Al Razzaq (born 1952), Iraqi poet and writer
 Mo Gawdat (born 20 June 1967), Egypt

Artists
See list of Arab artists

Other
 Rima Fakih, Lebanese, Miss USA 2010
 Valerie Domínguez Tarud, Lebanese, previous Miss Colombia
 Dina Azar, Miss Lebanon 1995
 Gabrielle Bou Rached, Miss Lebanon 2005
 Sonia Fares, Miss Lebanon 1969
 Nadine Wilson Njeim, Miss Lebanon 2007
 Georgina Rizk (born 1953), Miss Lebanon 1970/Miss Universe 1971
 Christina Sawaya, Miss Lebanon 2001/Miss International 2002
 Rosarita Tawil, Miss Lebanon 2008
 Moustapha Akkad, Syrian film producer and director

Entrepreneurs
 Ahmed bin Zayed Al Nahyan (1968–2010), UAE businessman
 Al-Waleed bin Talal (born 1955), member of the Saudi royal family, and world's 19th richest person in 2010
 Mohamed Alabbar, UAE businessman
 John Zogby, Lebanese founder and current President/CEO of Zogby International
 Naguib Sawiris, 62nd richest person on earth in a 2007 list of billionaires, reaching US$10.0 billion with his company Orascom Telecom Holding
 Najeeb Halaby, Syrian father of Queen Noor of Jordan Lisa Elhalabi, Administrator of the Federal Aviation Administration; CEO, and chairman of Pan Am
 Manuel Moroun, owner of CenTra, Inc., the holding company which controls the Ambassador Bridge and Michigan Central Depot
 Jacques Nasser, Lebanese, former president and CEO of Ford Motor Company
 John J. Mack, Lebanese, Chairman of the Board and CEO of Morgan Stanley
 Charles Corm, Lebanese, exclusive agent of over 50 major U.S. brands including Ford Motor Company
 Ray R. Irani, Palestinian, Chairman and CEO of Occidental Petroleum
 Carlos Ghosn, Lebanese, Chairman and CEO of Renault and Nissan

Sports
 Ahmed Kaddour, Lebanese professional boxer, from NBC show The Contender
 Alaa Abdelnaby, NBA player for the Portland Trail Blazers, Milwaukee Bucks, Boston Celtics, Philadelphia 76ers, and the Sacramento Kings
 Bill George, NFL player and Hall of Famer
 Drew Haddad, Indianapolis Colts
 Doug Flutie, (Lebanese father) NFL Player of the Buffalo Bills and San Diego Chargers
 Gavin Maloof, owns the Sacramento Kings
 George Maloof, Sr., owned the NBA’s Houston Rockets
 Jeff George, quarterback for several NFL teams
 Jim Harrick, UCLA’s coach
 Joe Robbie, former owner and founder of the NFL's Miami Dolphins
 John Jaha, sports athlete, of the MLB Milwaukee Brewers
 Justin Abdelkader, American ice hockey forward playing for the Detroit Red Wings of the National Hockey League (NHL)
 Omar Sheika, Palestinian professional boxer, four-time world title challenger.
 Riyad Karim Mahrez, Algerian professional footballer for Manchester City F.C. and Premier League champion (seasons:2015-2016, 2018-2019)
 Rich Kotite, NFL coach
 Rocco Baldelli, Syrian professional baseball Red Sox
 Rony Seikaly, Lebanese former NBA Player, now DJ
 Nasser Al-Attiyah, Qatari 2012 Olympic skeet bronze medallist, and racing driver
 Mostapha al-Turk, Lebanese retired MMA fighter that competed in the UFC
 Mohamed Salah, Egyptian professional footballer for Liverpool F.C. and twice Premier League Golden Boot winner
 Omar Al Somah, Syrian professional footballer for Al Ahli Saudi FC and three-time Saudi Pro League top scorer
 Omar Abdulrahman

Militants
Abu Bakr al-Baghdadi, ISIS terrorist
Abu Musab al-Zarqawi, Terrorist
Abu Sayyaf, ISIS terrorist
Abu Waheeb, ISIS terrorist
Jihadi John, ISIS terrorist
Sajida al-Rishawi, ISIS suicide bomber

See also
 Arabic
 Arabs
 List of Arab scientists and scholars
 List of Jews from the Arab World
 List of Algerians
 List of Libyans
 List of Lebanese people
 List of Egyptians
 List of Algerians
 List of Syrians
 List of Palestinians
 List of Jordanians
 List of Moroccans 
 List of Arab Americans
 List of Arab citizens of Israel
 List of Muslim scientists

References

Arab
 Arabs
Arabic-speaking people